The discography of Simply Red, a British soul band, consists of twelve studio albums, six compilation albums, one extended play, fifty-three singles and a number of other appearances.

The band's first single "Money's Too Tight (To Mention)", was released in 1985 and reached the United Kingdom Top 20. Their debut album, Picture Book, was also released in 1985. The following year the band released "Holding Back the Years", which reached number one in Ireland and the US and number two in the UK. Their second album, Men and Women was released in 1987. Third album A New Flame was released in 1989, containing "If You Don't Know Me by Now", which became their second US number one hit. Their fourth album Stars, became the best-selling album for two years running in Europe after its release in 1991 and was certified 12× Platinum in the UK.

Simply Red released "Fairground" in 1995, which became the band's first UK number one single. Its parent album was Life. The band followed this up with cover heavy Blue in 1998 and Love and the Russian Winter in 1999. Subsequent releases included Home in 2003, a mixture of original songs and covers; Simplified in 2005, mainly an album of stripped-down versions of their hit songs; and Stay, which was the band's tenth studio album released in 2007.

Mick Hucknall announced his intention to split the band in 2010; following which the band embarked on a farewell tour which commenced during 2009 and 2010.
The band re-formed in 2015.

Albums

Studio albums

Notes

Compilation albums

Live albums
 Cuba! (2006)
 Simply Red Stay Live at the Royal Albert Hall (2007)
 Simply Red Farewell – Live in Concert at Sydney Opera House (2011)
 Symphonica in Rosso – Live at Ziggo Dome, Amsterdam (2018)

Extended plays

Singles

1980s

1990s

2000s–present

Music videos

Videography
 A Starry Night with Simply Red (1992)
 Simply Red – Live in London (1998)
 Greatest Video Hits (2002)
 Home Live in Sicily (2003)
 Classic Albums: Stars (2005)
 Cuba (2006)
 Stay – Live at the Royal Albert Hall (2007)
 Simply Red 25: The Greatest Hits (2008)
 Simply Red Farewell – Live in Concert at Sydney Opera House (2011)

Notes

References

Discographies of British artists
Rock music group discographies